St. Berks is a BBC children's radio drama set in the fictitious English School of St. Berks.
Particularly noteworthy is that it was the first ever BBC digital commission - Because it would also be available for download on the internet, new royalty contracts had to be drawn up as there was no way of knowing how many times each episode would be "broadcast".

St Berks has been serialised on BBC Radio 4 and the digital station BBC Radio 7.  It was written by Richard Megson and Dave Washer, and stars Elliott Nicholls, Rosie Wilkinson, Tom George, James Rawlings, Sean Connolly.

Characters

Pupils at St. Berks

Preston Paul Patrick Price- A perfectly normal schoolboy- main character.

Albert Scheinstein - His friend.  A real brainbox- practically knows everything about everything.  He and Preston temporarily fall out in the first episode.

Hilda and Matilda- Twins who always speak in unison.

Tall Tina- A girl who towers above her classmates.

Jemima- A snobbish girl on whom Preston has a crush.  The feeling is not returned.

Teachers

Edith Concrete - Headmistress.  She only appears in the first episode, but we get the impression that she is draconian.

Mr. Nigel North - Preston and his friends' class teacher.  Mr. North is a draconian teacher, hence "Nutter North", the nickname Preston gives him.  His identical twin brother, Neil North, substitutes for him for a short period while he is ill.  Mr. North is a draconian teacher, whereas Neil is nauseatingly nice.  They are identical twins, which makes the students think that Mr. North has had  a dramatic change of character, until they see them together.

Another teacher, Mr. South, is mentioned very near the beginning, but never appears.  We gain the impression that he is a decent man, as Preston and his friends think he is going to be teaching him this year, and are looking forward to it.

Other characters

All characters below appear in only one episode, with the exception of Basher Baines;

The Queen appears in one episode, with two corgis, Kylie and Britney.  She is portrayed as a stereotypical elderly woman.

The Mayor of Berktown- makes a very brief appearance, when he makes a speech in honour of temporary hero Albert Scheinstein.

Mr. Slab- Owner of the local concrete factory, also appears in only

Mr. Root- An over-enthusiastic summer camp owner

Basher Baines- A bully from a neighbouring school- he and his cronies terrorise Preston's gang.

Episodes

The show was serialised for the BBC Radio 4 programme, Go 4 It, and told in its entirety on the Big Toe Radio Show on BBC 7 for the Super Sunday Story.  The serial ran as follows.

Episode 1- On a boring field trip to the concrete museum, Albert Scheinstein works out a theory to make concrete stronger, and is hailed as a hero.  He becomes rich and snobbish, spurning his old friends.  But everything goes wrong when it is discovered that the concrete smells of old socks.  Everyone turns against him, and he loses all his wealth.  Albert tries to make it up with his friends.  They are reluctant, especially Preston, until Albert's rubber concrete saves them from a bus crash- then everything is forgotten.

Episode 2- The class think Mr. North has become nice, but it turns out to be his twin brother, Neil, who is as different in temperament from his brother as he could possibly be.  He makes learning fun through musical geography and trampolining trigonometry, but it doesn't last long- Mr. North returns, badder than ever.

Episode 3- The gang go on an end-of-term trip to a summer camp.  They discover that their arch enemy, Basher Baines', school, are on the trip as well.  The camp owner, Mr. Root, serves them some delicious food, but Mr. North throws up and passes out when he discovers what was in the sausages- squirrel.  With Mr. North out of action, Mr. Root proceeds to scare the students with campfire ghost stories.  Basher Baines has more scares in store for them.

Extra episodes were sometimes included;

The students are given the honour of decorating the Queen's palace.  Things go wrong when Mr. North accidentally uses one of the Queen's beloved Corgis as a paint-roller.  He is locked in the tower, the Queen vowing that he will never see the light of day again.  The episode ends here, but since this is not the final episode, we are left to assume the students sprung him from jail.

Valentine's Day episode.

BBC Radio 4 programmes
BBC Radio 4 Extra programmes